Thrithala State assembly constituency is one of the 140 state legislative assembly constituencies in the state of Kerala located in southern India.  It is also one of the 7 state legislative assembly constituencies included in the Ponnani Lok Sabha constituency. As of the 2021 assembly elections, the current MLA is M. B. Rajesh of Communist Party of India (Marxist).

Local self governed segments
Thrithala Niyamasabha constituency is composed of the following local self governed segments:

{ "type": "ExternalData",  "service": "geoshape",  "ids": "Q13110239,Q13111922,Q13110970,Q6958393,Q13113111,Q13113059,Q16909824,Q13112599"}

Members of Legislative Assembly

The following list contains all members of Kerala legislative assembly who have represented Thrithala Niyama Sabha Constituency during the period of various assemblies:

Key

Election results 
Percentage change (±%) denotes the change in the number of votes from the immediate previous election.

Niyamasabha Election 2021 
There were 1,94,108 registered voters in constituency for the 2021 election.

Niyamasabha Election 2016 
There were 1,55,638 registered voters in constituency for the 2016 election.

Niyamasabha Election 2011 
There were 1,78,784 registered voters in the constituency for the 2011 election.

1952

See also 
 Thrithala
 Palakkad district
 List of constituencies of the Kerala Legislative Assembly
 2016 Kerala Legislative Assembly election

References 

Assembly constituencies of Kerala

State assembly constituencies in Palakkad district